The Janja Monastery ( is a Serbian Orthodox monastery located in Nova Varoš in southwestern Serbia. The monastery belongs to the Eparchy of Mileševa and is dedicated to the Righteous parents of the Holy Mother of God, Joachim and Anne. It is assumed it was built in the 15th century, and it was destroyed at the end of 17th century. in 1993, archaeological excavations of the site began, while in 2008 the restoration of the monastery began, finally being finished on July 22, 2012.

Geography
It is located in the village of Rutoši in the Nova Varoš municipality, and is bordered to the villages Seništa and Radoinja. It is situated on the left bank of the river Uvac, in the historical region of Raška.

Early history
Little is known of the history of the monastery. Based on the architecture and furnishing of the church, it is assumed that it was first built in the mid- or late 15th century, and it was then destroyed at the end of 17th century. In the Gospel of Žitomislić Monastery in Herzegovina, it is said that the book was written in the Uvac monastery in 1671. In Serbian epic poetry about the Nemanjić dynasty era, and according to local tradition, it is known as the "Janja Church in Stari Vlah".

Archaeological excavations
With the project "The holy waters of Lim", a team of experts from the National Museum in Užice began archaeological excavations at the site, at the estate of Sreten and Petronije Gordić-Pinjević, on July 5, 1993. On that occasion, the team unearthed the single-nave structure, fundamentals 9.30 meters by 6 meters below the "Janja rock", and found a marble table of composed of three elements, parts of a candle holder and chandeliers, fragments of pottery vessels, while on the walls in the lower reaches  remains of frescoes were discovered.

Restoration
The restoration of the monastery began on October 2, 2008, with a liturgy served by bishop Filaret Mićević and the monastic brotherhood of the Eparchy of Mileševa. On Epiphany, 2011, the church and crosses were raised and consecrated, after which the finishing work on the facade temple and interior design began. The iconostasis and the chandelier were painted by iconographer and fresco painter Ivan Kovalčik Mileševac from Novi Sad. Through the efforts of prioress Justina Petković, with financial support of Nebojsa Grujović and entrepreneurs from the Rutoši village, and financial contributions of locals of Seništa, Rutoši and Radoinja, the largest part of work on the monastery church was secured. On July 22, 2012, the monastery reconstruction was finished.

See also
 List of Serbian Orthodox monasteries

References 

Monastery Janja - Monastery of the Holy righteous Joachim and Anne
Sanctuary lifted from the ruins
Monastery of the Holy righteous Joachim and Anne - Temple to the people

Serbian Orthodox monasteries in Serbia
15th-century Serbian Orthodox church buildings
21st-century Serbian Orthodox church buildings
Zlatibor District
Destroyed churches
Archaeological sites in Serbia
2012 establishments in Serbia
Rebuilt buildings and structures in Serbia